Governor Barstow may refer to:

John L. Barstow (1832–1913), 39th Governor of Vermont
William A. Barstow (1813–1865), 3rd Governor of Wisconsin